Neuperlach (Central Bavarian: Neiperlach) is a borough in the southeast of the Bavarian capital, Munich. and is part of the city district no. 16, Ramersdorf-Perlach. It was built starting in 1967 east of the former village of Perlach on the ground of the former Perlacher Haid. Neuperlach is located east of the boroughs Ramersdorf and Perlach, south of the city districts no. 14 (Berg am Laim) and no. 15 (Trudering-Riem), west of the borough Waldperlach and north of Unterbiberg (which is part of the municipality of Neubiberg). The borough encompasses multiplehousing estates, including several high-rise estates, and is one of Germany's biggest satellite towns. In the center of Neuperlach the large pep shopping mall is located, one of the most profitable shopping centers in Germany. The Hachinger Bach runs through the western part of Neuperlach from north to south. The stream also passes through the western part of the Ostpark.

References 

Quarters of Munich